Anders Bülow (born 14 July 1994) is a Danish international cricketer who made his debut for the Danish national team in June 2014. He is an all-rounder who bats and bowls right-handed.

Career
Before making his debut for the senior team, Bülow played for Denmark at under-13, under-15, under-17, and under-19 level.  He represented the Danish under-19s at the 2010, 2011, and 2013 editions of the European Under-19 Championship. Bülow's senior debut for Denmark came at the 2014 World Cricket League Division Four tournament in Singapore. He appeared in two of his team's six matches, a round-robin match against Singapore and the third-place play-off against Italy, and in the latter took 2/42 opening the bowling with Aftab Ahmed. Bülow has since been named in Denmark's squad for the 2016 WCL Division Four event in Los Angeles.

Bülow has also played club cricket for Skanderborg in the Danish Cricket League.

In March 2018, he was named in Denmark's squad for the 2018 ICC World Cricket League Division Four tournament in Malaysia. In September 2018, he was named in Denmark's squad for the 2018 ICC World Cricket League Division Three tournament in Oman. In May 2019, he was named in Denmark's squad for a five-match series against Leinster Lightning in Ireland, in preparation for the Regional Finals of the 2018–19 ICC T20 World Cup Europe Qualifier tournament in Guernsey. The same month, he was named in Denmark's squad for the Regional Finals qualification tournament. He made his Twenty20 International (T20I) debut for Denmark, against Italy, on 18 June 2019.

References

External links
Player profile and statistics  at Cricket Archive
Player profile and statistics at ESPNcricinfo

1994 births
Living people
Danish cricketers
Denmark Twenty20 International cricketers
People from Horsens
Sportspeople from the Central Denmark Region